Daniel Padilla is a Filipino actor and recording artist. He have hold three major concert in Philippines. The first headlining concert title, Daniel: Live!, served as his birthday concert, was held on April 30, 2013. In 2014, Padilla continued his concert streak with Dos: The Daniel Padilla Concert as he rocked the Araneta Coliseum once again on April 30. Seeking for further challenge, by 2015, the actor-singer brought his music and artistry for the first time at the Mall of Asia Arena with Most Wanted. Apart from changing the venue, the concert likewise saw a change in its date as it happened not on Daniel's birthday month but on June 13. In addition to his own headlining concert, he hold multi national tours with Yeng Constantino in April 2014.

Apart from his musical career as an actor he also involved on the One Magical Night US Tours. In addition Padilla also performed on Asap Live in New York in 2016.

Headlining concert

See also
 Daniel Padilla discography
 Daniel Padilla filmography
 Daniel Padilla videography
 List of awards and nominations received by Daniel Padilla

References

Concert tours
Padilla, Daniel
Daniel Padilla concert tours